The Mandarin is an Australian online magazine established in 2014. The site, which reports news of interest to Australian public sector managers, is published by Tom Burton and owned by Private Media. Its launch was part of Private Media's "broader focus on business and the government sector"; Ken Henry, Lucy Turnbull, and Graeme Samuel served on the website's initial advisory committee. As of 2020, the managing editor was Chris Johnson. Its reporting has been referenced by The New Daily and the Sydney Morning Herald.

References

External links
 official website

2014 establishments in Australia
Business magazines published in Australia
Australian news websites
Magazines established in 2014
Online magazines